The Kavšek Bridge or Kauschegg Bridge (the historical Slovene name inscribed on the bridge), sometimes listed as the Karchegger Bridge, is a one-arch stone bridge crossing Glinščica Creek in Podutik, a neighbourhood in Ljubljana, the capital of Slovenia. It was built by the board of the first district road and named after Franz Kauschegg, who led the works. It is part of Podutik Street and is used as a walkway and for a bicycle lane; a new bridge for motorised traffic has been built next to it.

Architecture
The bridge has low stone walls on both sides built from Glinica limestone blocks in two rows. On its southern wall stands a column with a relief of the Madonna and Child in a shrine on its top. On its base, an intercession to Mary in four verses has been carved. Also written are the year of construction of the bridge and the name of the stonemason, Alojzij Vodnik. The relief is a faithful copy of the original one and was restored by Julijan Renko. The base is original, whereas the upper part of the column with the shrine was made as part of the rebuilding by the Vodnik family from Kamna Gorica near Podutik. The north wall had a stone cross, which was demolished after World War II.

History
The bridge was built in 1901 from local limestone under the direction of Franc Kauschegg, road committee member, and was used for road traffic until the 1960s. It collapsed on 29 May 1985. In 1993, it was rebuilt in its original form and opened for public use on 19 May 1993. Since August 2001, it has been protected as local cultural heritage.

Gallery

References

Bridges in Ljubljana
Bridges completed in 1901
Arch bridges in Slovenia
Dravlje District
Stone arch bridges
20th-century architecture in Slovenia